The Green Party - The Greens, often shortened to The Greens is a Romanian political party that ideologically follows green politics and environmentalism. The Green Party is the only political party in Romania that is a member of the European Green Party (EGP). Thus, it is a full rights member of the European Green Party (EGP), represented by the Greens–European Free Alliance in the European Parliament. The Green Party in Romania has one vote in EGP Council, the leading European Greens' Leadership Group, which meets twice a year. At local and central political level in Romania however, it is still a microparty.

Ideology 
The Green Party is a party that has a center-left to left-wing ideology, being among the few left-wing political organizations in Romania. Before the 2022 Congress, the party was moderate, from the center to the center-left.

Social 
The Greens Party is supportive for environmental causes, such as reforestation and reductions in carbon emissions. It supports an extension in individual rights as well as greater separation of church and state, including a gradual removal of all state funding for religious institutions. Like the vast majority of Romanian political parties, it is supportive of European integration.

It is one of the Romanian parties that supporting civil partnerships, as well as measures to reduce homophobia in schools and society at large. It supported a boycott of the 2018 Romanian constitutional referendum which attempted to ban same-sex marriage.

Environment and Green Economy 
The Greens consider that the budgetary and private financial flows invested in industries with high carbon dioxide emissions are today greater than the budgetary and private financial flows intended for adaptation to climate change and the successful green transition. We are basically financing our own demise!

The first step towards the success of the green transition means reversing this trend!

Today, after 33 years of market economy, in Romania we tax labor more than capital, which inhibits performance, effort, creates major social inequities, affects the social balance. We cannot place the deficit and all the black holes solely on the shoulders of the hard workers. The state can no longer subsidize the failures of big capital endlessly, while keeping social spending or investments for the green transition far below the European average. The logic in which when the profits of big capital increase, the Market is God, and when they are absent, the State is God must be completely eliminated.

The success of the green transition means money serving life, not life serving money!

They support the participation and representation of young people in democratic and decision-making processes at all levels, including by organizing debating groups in schools, high schools and universities.

He believes that children should be involved in the evaluation and formulation of policies through dialogue with experienced people.

They also support the right to vote from the age of 16 for all types of elections.

Youth politics 
Advocates for all new legislative acts and public policy projects to be approved only after assessing the impact on young people up to 30 years old. They support the introduction of a mechanism for monitoring legislation from a youth perspective, including both an impact assessment and a mechanism for consultation with youth representatives when legislation has an impact on young people.

The decrease in the number of NEETS in Romania (young people who neither work, nor study, nor participate in a professional training program) can also be done by developing a wider professional orientation process, starting from the age of 12. They want to enable young people to benefit from visits/short experiential internships to for-profit and non-profit organizations, in close cooperation between schools, local administrations and respective organizations/enterprises to allow young people to have a first contact with the professional environment .

They also support the introduction of Universal Basic Income for students over a period of 3 years.

Work and workers 
The Greens considered that in Romania and beyond, the "price of work" has unfortunately become the "cost of work". The work performed is not rewarded at its true value in Romania. We are still a country of cheap labor, with an explosive potential that risks blowing up all social balances. The Greens support increasing the minimum wage and linking it to the minimum consumption basket for a decent living. This is the only way decent living will no longer be a dead letter in the Constitution, and purchasing power will not collapse under the pressure of inflationary crises. They support the introduction of the minimum wage in the European Union as a mechanism of social justice, at the national and European level. They support the strengthening of social dialogue in Romania, the reform of the Labor Code from the perspective of the right to collective negotiations, respect for health and safety at work and the balance between work and private life. It pleads for a new social dialogue law to confirm and guarantee negotiations at the national level, to facilitate the formation of unions, the initiation of strikes, the negotiation of collective contracts at the sector level. They demand the reduction of the union representativeness threshold from 50%+1 to 30%. They demand transparent reports on health and safety at work and hours worked by employees, in all public and private companies. The success of the green transition means decent, safe, sustainable jobs, a new healthy work-life balance. They ask the Government and the Parliament to urgently ratify the ILO Convention no. 190, of the International Labor Organization for the elimination of violence and harassment in the world of work.

Youth organisation 

Young Greens (Romanian: Tinerii Verzi) is the youth organisation of the Green Party.

Tinerii Verzi, are the only youth organization with a left-green orientation in Romania and also the first to emphasize social and environmental justice.

The organization was founded in March 2022. On August 15, 2022, the first General Assembly of Young Greens took place. In the AG, the statute, the program were validated and the members of the National Bureau were elected.

History

The Green Party was founded in November 2005 by Gheorghe Ionicescu, after the merger of FER and AP was revoked. Ecologist Federation of Romania (FER) was previously founded in 1990 and is the predecessor of the Green Party. He participated in the presidential election in 2009, supporting the candidacy of Remus Cernea. Also in 2009, Ionicescu died, and Silviu Popa was appointed as a chairperson of the Green Party to replace Ionicescu. Popa was validated at the party congress on 26 September 2009 and resigned in early 2012.

At the local elections held in 2012, the Green Party gained 2 mayors (Iclănzel - Mureş and Azuga - Prahova) and 124 local councilors, with 0.87% of the votes at national level. In the 2012, at the parliamentary elections, the Green Party had two MPs (Ovidiu Iane and Remus Cernea) on the USL lists.

On 13 May 2013, in the context of the public debate on the exploration and exploitation of shale gas, the Green Party is drifted apart the SLU's position and remains consistent with environmental principles, according to the press release: "We oppose to the  shale gas, mining operations at  Rosia Montana (Roşia Montană), we are extremely concerned that within the SLU there are more and more opinions and intentions to go ahead, to move towards such projects on shale gas and cyanide. Under these conditions, we cannot continue the collaboration with SLU because we would support such a political direction."

"The Green Party begins a new political path on September 3, 2022. A new team! A new center-left political program! A new approach! At the Dalles Hall in Bucharest, starting at 12.00, the Extraordinary Congress of the Green Party (Greens) will take place. A new statute, a new political program and a new leadership team will be submitted for debate and adoption.

They will apply for the positions of co-presidents: Marius Lazăr – political scientist, and Lavinia Cosma- counselor for vocational guidance, ex-USR parliamentarian, and for that of executive president - Adrian Dohotaru, environmental activist -ex- USR parliamentarian."

Electoral history

Legislative elections 

Notes:

4 FER (Green Party's predecessor) previously merged with AP. The merger was revoked after the elections.

5 Green Ecologist Party members: PER and the Green Party (PV).

6 At that time, for those legislative elections, the Green Party (PV) competed on the PSD ballot, within the Social Liberal Union (USL).

Presidential elections

European elections

Local elections

2020 local election results

Logos

See also 

 NOW Party
 European Greens
 Green party
 Green politics
 List of environmental organizations
 Volt Romania

References

External links 
  Partidul Verde (official site)

2005 establishments in Romania
Political parties established in 2005
European Green Party
Centre-left parties in Europe
 
Global Greens member parties
Green political parties in Romania
Progressive parties
Registered political parties in Romania
Pro-European political parties in Romania